"Thousand Miles" is a song by Australian rapper and singer the Kid Laroi. It was released as a single through Columbia Records on 22 April 2022. The song was written by Laroi alongside Billy Walsh and producers Andrew Watt and Louis Bell. "Thousand Miles" is an acoustically driven midtempo  emo pop ballad that blends guitar strumming and trap beats.

At the 2022 ARIA Music Awards, the song earned the Kid Laroi a nomination for Best Solo Artist. The song was nominated for Best Pop Release and Song of the Year, winning the former.

At the APRA Music Awards of 2023, the song was shortlisted for Song of the Year.

Background and promotion
Snippets of "Thousand Miles" had been floating around since 2021, but it was not until the following year where it received a proper release. Laroi teased and deleted lyrics to the song, and performed it at his live shows. On 13 April 2022, Laroi announced the release date for the song with a link to pre-save the single. Subsequently, the artist posted a 10-second TikTok video of himself playing a snippet of the song, encouraging fans to share their own "last mistake" while using the sound before photos of his former manager Scooter Braun flash across the screen. The clip had amassed over 50,000 likes within two hours of its posting. On 19 April 2022, Laroi took to social media to post a six-second clip of him sitting at a bench before a piano unexpectedly falls onto him. The video then cuts to black and displays the single's release date.

Accolades

Commercial performance
In Australia, "Thousand Miles" debuted at number four on the ARIA Singles Chart, making it Laroi's fifth top-ten entry. It entered the US Billboard Hot 100 at number 15, becoming his fourth top-20 hit and highest debut as a solo artist.

Music video
The official music video premiered to YouTube on 22 April 2022, the same day the song was released. The theatrical-leaning clip was directed by Christian Breslauer, who has also directed music videos for Charlie Puth and Lil Nas X. It features appearances from TikTok influencer, Katarina Deme, Laroi's girlfriend.

It begins with Deme as a barista with Laroi buying a coffee. The rest of the video depicts Laroi, dressed in white, being tortured multiple times by his evil self, dressed in red. Eventually, Laroi gets hit by a train, with his evil self performing surgery on him after. He then steals his girlfriend in which she pushes bandaged Laroi away in a wheelchair and he ironically gets hit again, this time by an ambulance van.

An American indie artist, Oliver Tree, posted an Instagram video showing how many of the music video's shots were taken from multiple of his own self-directed music videos.

Credits and personnel
Credits adapted from Tidal.
 The Kid Laroi – vocals, songwriting
 Andrew Watt – production, songwriting, guitar
 Louis Bell – production, songwriting, keyboards, programming, vocal engineering
 Billy Walsh – songwriting
 Anthony Vilchis – assistant engineering
 Trey Station – assistant engineering
 Zach Pereyra – assistant engineering
 Paul Lamalfa – engineering
 Randy Merrill – mastering
 Manny Marroquin – mixing

Charts

Weekly charts

Year-end charts

Certifications

Release history

References

2022 singles
2022 songs
ARIA Award-winning songs
Columbia Records singles
Emo pop songs
The Kid Laroi songs
Pop ballads
Song recordings produced by Andrew Watt (record producer)
Song recordings produced by Louis Bell
Songs written by Andrew Watt (record producer)
Songs written by Louis Bell
Songs written by the Kid Laroi